Sitaleki Timani (born 19 September 1986), is a Tongan-born, Australian professional rugby union footballer. He made his test debut for the Wallabies in 2011. His usual position is lock. Timani's  professional club career spanned eight seasons of Top 14 in France and seven seasons of Super Rugby in Australia. He currently plays for the RC Toulonnais in the Top 14.

Family and early life
Sitaleki Timani was born in the Tongan village of Kolonga. His brothers Sione and Lopeti are both international rugby players.

Timani played soccer until he attended Liahona High School and was introduced to rugby union. He was selected for the Tongan Schoolboys rugby team in 2003, and won a scholarship to attend Auckland Grammar School in New Zealand.

He moved to Australia at the age of 19 and switched codes, playing rugby league for Cronulla-Sutherland Sharks in the NRL's Jersey Flegg competition in 2006, and in NSW Premier League in 2007.

Rugby union career
In August 2007, Timani returned to rugby union, playing for Perth Spirit in the Australian Rugby Championship. He was selected for all Perth Spirit matches for the season, and played 8 times as starting lock. The team finished third on the ARC ladder, but lost their semi-final to the eventual champion team, the Central Coast Rays. The following year, Timani made his Super Rugby debut for the Western Force against the Sharks on 15 February 2008 in Durban, although he only made 3 appearances for the franchise during the season. He moved to the Brumbies in 2009 and played most of the Super Rugby season, but then fell from favour and did not get any game time in 2010.

Timani then took up a development contract with the NSW Waratahs, and won a regular starting position in the 2011 season. At that time, he was eligible to play for both Tonga (by birth) and Australia (by residency). He chose Australia and was selected by the Wallabies, playing against Samoa at Stadium Australia in Sydney on 17 July 2011.

His decision to play for Australia meant he became ineligible to play for Tonga and it probably cost him an appearance at the Rugby World Cup later that year. He was not selected in the Australian squad for the 2011 tournament but probably would have been selected for Tonga, if eligible.

In 2013, he signed a three-year deal with French side, Montpellier. Timani joined the club after travelling with the Wallabies on their 2013 end-of-year tour. He continued his career in the French Top 14 for another four years with Clermont from 2016.

Timani returned to Australia in 2021, rejoining the Western Force to play in the Super Rugby AU competition.

Personal life 
On 15 December 2012, Sitaleki married Angela (née Kelava), whom he had been dating for three years.

References

External links
Club stats on It's Rugby
ARU Player Profile
Waratahs Profile

1986 births
Living people
Tongan emigrants to Australia
Australian rugby union players
Rugby union locks
New South Wales Waratahs players
Western Force players
ACT Brumbies players
RC Toulonnais players
Australia international rugby union players
People educated at Auckland Grammar School
Montpellier Hérault Rugby players
ASM Clermont Auvergne players